Mark Andrew Hastings (8 May 1968 – 17 March 2022) was a New Zealand cricketer. He played ten first-class matches for Canterbury between 1992 and 2001. He was also part of New Zealand's squad for the 1988 Youth Cricket World Cup.

References

External links
 

1968 births
2022 deaths
New Zealand cricketers
Canterbury cricketers
Cricketers from Christchurch